This is a list of military special forces units, also known as special operations forces (SOF), currently active with countries around the world, that are specially organised, trained and equipped to conduct special operations.

These are distinct from special-purpose infantry units, such as the Royal Marine Commandos, found on the list of commando units, and also paratrooper units found on the list of paratrooper forces.

Definitions

NATO currently defines "special operations" as:
Military activities conducted by specially designated, organized, trained, and equipped forces, manned with selected personnel, using unconventional tactics, techniques, and modes of employment. 

In 2001, as part of efforts to create a framework for consultation and cooperation between NATO and Russia, the NATO-RUSSIA Glossary of Contemporary Political and Military Terms further defined special operations and special operations forces:
special operations military activities conducted by specially designated, organized, trained and equipped forces using operational techniques and modes of employment not standard to conventional forces. These activities are conducted across the full range of military operations independently or in coordination with operations of conventional forces to achieve political, military, psychological and economic objectives. Politico-military considerations may require clandestine, covert or discreet techniques and the acceptance of a degree of physical and political risk not associated with conventional operations.
special-operations forces strategic formations and units of the armed forces, whose role is to conduct sabotage, reconnaissance, subversive and other special operations on the territory of foreign countries. In wartime they may also be assigned tasks such as intelligence-gathering, the seizure or destruction of key installations, the conduct of psychological operations or the organization of insurgencies in the enemy's rear area. The Armed Forces of the Russian Federation have separate special-operations forces brigades, battalions and companies which are integrated with the intelligence assets of military districts, fronts, fleets, armies or corps.

The United States definition of special operations is:
Operations requiring unique modes of employment, tactical techniques, equipment and training often conducted in hostile, denied, or politically sensitive environments and characterized by one or more of the following: time sensitive, clandestine, low visibility, conducted with and/or through indigenous forces, requiring regional expertise, and/or a high degree of risk.

The Canadian definition of special operations forces is:
Organizations containing specially trained personnel that are organized, equipped and trained to conduct high-risk, high value, special operations to achieve military, political, economic, or international objectives by using special and unique operational methodologies in hostile, denied, or politically sensitive area to achieve desired tactical operational, and/or strategic effects in times of peace, conflict, or war.

Albania

Albanian Armed Forces
 Special Operations Battalion

Algeria 

Algerian Land Forces (CFT)
104th Operational Maneuvers Regiment (104e RMO)
116th Operational Maneuvers Regiment (116e RMO)
Algerian Navy (AN)
Navy Special Action Regiment (RASM)
Algerian Republican Guard (GR)
Special Intervention Regiment (RSI)

Angola

Angolan Armed Forces
Special Forces Brigade (BRIFE)

Argentina

Argentine Army
Special Operations Forces Group
601 Commando Company
602 Commando Company

Argentine Navy
Tactical Divers Group 
Amphibious Commandos Group

Armenia

Armenian Army
 One Spetsnaz regiment

Australia

Australian Army
Special Operations Command
Special Forces Group
1st Commando Regiment
2nd Commando Regiment Incorporates the role of Tactical Assault Group (East)
Special Air Service Regiment (SASR) Incorporates the role of Tactical Assault Group (West)
Special Operations Engineer Regiment
6th Aviation Regiment
171st Special Operations Aviation Squadron
173rd Aviation Squadron
Royal Australian Air Force
No. 4 Squadron, B Flight

Royal Australian Navy
Clearance Diving Branch Divers serve with 2nd Commando Regiment as part of Tactical Assault Group (East)

Austria

Austrian Army
 Jagdkommando

Azerbaijan

Azerbaijani Armed Forces
Special Forces of Azerbaijan
641st Naval Special Operations Brigade
777th Special Forces Regiment

Bangladesh 

Bangladesh Army
 Para-Commando Brigade
Bangladesh Navy
 Special Warfare Diving and Salvage (SWADS)
Bangladesh Air Force

 41 Squadron Airborne

Belarus

Special Operations Forces Command
 5th Spetsnaz Brigade
 38th Guards Mobile Brigade - Brest
 103rd Guards Mobile Brigade - Vitebsk

State Security Committee of the Republic of Belarus
 Alpha Group (Belarus)

Belgium

Belgian Land Component
 Special Operations Regiment in Heverlee

Botswana 

 Botswana Ground Force 
 1st Commando Regiment

Brazil 

Brazilian Army
Special Operations Command
1st Special Forces Battalion (1º BFEsp) 
1st Commando Battalion (1º BAC)
Special Operation Support Battalion
Brazilian Air Force
Airborne Rescue Squadron
Brazilian Navy
Marine Corps Special Operations Battalion (COMANF)
Combat Divers Groupment (GRUMEC)

Brunei

Royal Brunei Land Forces
 Special Forces Regiment (SFR)

Bulgaria

Bulgarian Land Forces
 68th Special Forces Brigade 
Bulgarian Navy
 65th Seaborne Special Reconnaissance Detachment

Burundi

National Defence Force
 4th Commando Battalion

Cambodia

Royal Cambodian Army
Special Forces Command (Cambodia)
Brigade 70 (B-70)

Canada 

Special Operations Forces Command
Joint Task Force 2 (JTF2)
Canadian Special Operations Regiment (CSOR)
427 Special Operations Aviation Squadron (427 SOAS)
Canadian Joint Incident Response Unit (CJIRU)

Chile 

 Lautaro Special Operations Brigade

China - PRC

People's Liberation Army
People's Liberation Army Special Operations Forces

Colombia

 National Army of Colombia
 Special Forces Division (División de fuerzas especiales (DIVFE))
Agrupación de Fuerzas Especiales Antiterroristas Urbanas
Colombian Air Force
 Special Air Commando Group (ECOEA)

Congo - DRC 

391st Commando battalion URR

Croatia 

Special Operations Command (Croatia)

Cuba

Black Wasp (Avispas Negras)

Czech Republic

601st Special Forces Group

Denmark

Special Operations Command (SOKOM)
 Jaeger Corps
 Frogman Corps
Danish Home Guard
Special Support and Reconnaissance Company

Ecuador 

Ecuadorain Army

 IWIAS Jungle Commandos

El Salvador 

Special Operations Command (CFE)

Egypt 

Sa'ka Forces (Thunderbolt Forces)
Unit 777
Unit 999

Estonia

Estonian Special Operations Force (ESTSOF)

Ethiopia 

Agazi Commando Division

Finland 

Finnish Army
Special Jaeger Company of the Utti Jaeger Regiment
Finnish Navy
Special Action Detachment of Coastal Brigade

France 

Special Operations Command
French Army
 Special Forces Command and Signal Company - (Compagnie de Commandement et de Transmissions des Forces Spéciales) (CCTFS)
1st Marine Infantry Parachute Regiment
13th Parachute Dragoon Regiment
4th Special Forces Helicopter Regiment
French Navy
FORFUSCO
Commandos Marine
French Air and Space Force
Air Parachute Commando n° 10, CPA 10
Special Operations Division, Transport section (ET 03/61 Poitou)
Directorate-General for External Security
Action Division

Georgia 

Defense Forces
 GSOF

Germany

German Army
 Rapid Forces Division
 Special Forces Command (KSK)
 Specialized Army Forces with Expanded Capabilities (EGB Forces) 
German Air Force
 Kampfretter
German Navy
 Naval Special Forces Command (KSM)

Ghana 
Ghana Armed Forces
Ghana Navy
Special Boat Squadron

Greece 

Hellenic Army
13th Special Operations Command
1st Infantry Division 
1st Raider/Paratrooper Brigade (LOK) (MAK)
32nd Marines Brigade

Hellenic Air Force
31st Search & Rescue Squadron (31MEED)

Hellenic Navy
Underwater Demolition Command (DYK) - is organized into sections called Underwater Demolition Teams (OYK)

Hungary

 HDF 34th Bercsényi László Special Forces Battalion
 HDF 25/88th Light Mixed Battalion
 HDF 5/24th 'Gergely Bornemissza' Reconnaissance Battalion

India

Armed Forces Special Operations Division

Indian Army
 Para (Special Forces)
Indian Navy
 Marine Commando Force (MARCOS)
Indian Air Force
 Garud Commando Force

Indonesia

Special Operations Command
Indonesian Army 
 Kopassus - Army special force command
 Tontaipur - Army combat reconnaissance platoon

Indonesian Navy
 Kopaska - Naval frogman commando
 Denjaka - Joint navy-marine special forces
 Taifib - Marine amphibious reconnaissance battalion
 Octopus Squad - naval offshore counter-terrorism unit

Indonesian Air Force
 Kopasgat - Air force special forces command
 Bravo Detachment 90 - counterterrorism unit of Kopasgat

Iran

Islamic Republic of Iran Army
65th Airborne Special Forces Brigade

Islamic Revolutionary Guard Corps
Quds Force 
Sepah Navy Special Force

Iraq 

Iraqi Special Operations Forces

Counter Terrorism Command (CTC)

Ireland 

Irish Army
Army Ranger Wing (ARW)

Israel 

Military Intelligence Directorate
General Staff Reconnaissance Unit 269 - Sayeret Matkal

Israeli Army
89th "Oz" Brigade
Unit 212 - Maglan
Unit 217 - Duvdevan
Unit 621 - Egoz

Israeli Navy
13th Flotilla - Shayetet 13

Israeli Air and Space Force
7th Special Air Forces Wing (He) 
Unit 5101 - Shaldag (Special Air-Ground Designating Team)
Unit 669 - Combat Search and Rescue and Airborne Medical Evacuation Unit
Unit 5700 - Forward Airfield Tactical Unit (He)

Italy

Italian Army
Army Special Forces Command (Italy)
9th Parachute Assault Regiment "Col Moschin"
185th Paratroopers Reconnaissance Target Acquisition Regiment "Folgore"
4th Alpini Parachutist Regiment
3rd Special Operations Helicopter Regiment

Italian Navy
Comando Subacquei ed Incursori (COMSUBIN)

Italian Air Force
 17º Stormo Incursori (ex R.I.A.M., CCT)

Carabinieri
Gruppo di Intervento Speciale (GIS) - in addition to special operations, is responsible for civil policing as a police tactical unit

Japan

Japan Ground Self-Defense Force
Special Forces Group

Japan Maritime Self-Defense Force
Special Boarding Unit

Jordan

Joint Special Operations Command
Special Forces Group - "King Abdulah II"
 Special Unit I - Specializing in counter terrorism on the basis of the 71st Special Battalion

Kenya

Special Operations Regiment (SOR)
Kenya Special Forces

Kuwait
 Kuwait 25th Commando Brigade

Korea, North - DPRK 

Korean People's Army Special Operation Force

Korea, South - ROK 

Republic of Korea Army
Republic of Korea Army Special Warfare Command
707th Special Mission Group

Republic of Korea Navy
Republic of Korea Naval Special Warfare Flotilla

Republic of Korea Marine Corps
Spartan 3000

Republic of Korea Air Force
Air Force Aerial Command Unit (CCT)
6th Search and Rescue Squadron (SART)

Kyrgyzstan 

Armed Forces of the Kyrgyz Republic
 25th Special Force Brigade Scorpion

Latvia

Latvian National Armed Forces
 Latvian Special Tasks Unit (SUV)

Lebanon

Special Operations Command

Lebanese Armed Forces
Counter-Sabotage Regiment (aka Moukafaha)
Lebanese Army
Lebanese Commando Regiment (aka "Ranger Regiment")
Lebanese Navy
Marine Commandos
Lebanese Air Force
Airborne Regiment

Lithuania

Lithuanian Special Operations Force

Malaysia

Malaysian Army 
Grup Gerak Khas (GGK)
Royal Malaysian Navy
PASKAL
Royal Malaysian Air Force
PASKAU

Maldives

 Special Force

Malta

Armed Forces of Malta
Special Operations Unit (SOU)

Mexico

Mexican Army
Special Forces Corps
Special Reaction Force

Mexican Navy
Amphibious Special Forces Group

Mongolia
084th Special Task Battalion

Montenegro

 Special Forces Company

Namibia

Namibian Special Forces

Netherlands

Netherlands Special Operations Command (NLD SOCOM)
Korps Commandotroepen (KCT)
Netherlands Maritime Special Operations Forces (NLMARSOF)

New Zealand

Special Operations Component Command
New Zealand Special Air Service

Nigeria

Armed Forces Special Forces (AFSF)
72nd Special Forces Battalion
Nigerian Navy
Special Boat Service
Deep Blue Special Intervention Forces (Maritime Security Unit)

North Macedonia

Army of the Republic of Macedonia
Special Operations Regiment ("Wolves")

Norway

Norwegian Special Operation Forces (NORSOF)
Armed Forces' Special Command
Navy Special Operation Command

Oman

 Sultan's Special Forces

Pakistan

 Pakistan Army
 Special Service Group (SSG)
 Pakistan Navy
 Special Service Group Navy (SSGN)
 Pakistan Air Force
 Special Service Wing (SSW)
 Civil Armed Forces (paramilitary)
 142 Special Operations Wing (SOW)

Paraguay

Paraguayan Armed Force
Special Forces Battalion - (Batallón Conjunto de Fuerzas Especiales)

Peru

Peruvian Armed Forces
Fuerza Delta

Philippines

Special Operations Command (Philippines)
Philippine Air Force
 710th Special Operations Wing (SPOW) 
Philippine Army
 1st Scout Ranger Regiment (SRR) 
 Special Forces Regiment (Airborne) (SFR-A) 
 Light Reaction Regiment (LRR) 
 Philippine Navy
 Naval Special Operations Command (NAVSOCOM)
 Philippine Marine Corps
 Marine Special Operations Group (MARSOG)
 Philippine Coast Guard
 Special Operations Force (SOF)

Poland

Special forces of Poland (Dowództwo Komponentu Wojsk Specjalnych, DKWS)
JW GROM (Jednostka Wojskowa GROM) 
JW Komandosów (Jednostka Wojskowa KOMANDOSÓW, JWK)
JW Formoza (Jednostka Wojskowa FORMOZA)
JW AGAT (Jednostka Wojskowa AGAT)
JW NIL (Jednostka Wojskowa NIL)
 7th Special Operations Squadron (7. Eskadra Działań Specjalnych, EDS)

Portugal

Portuguese Army
Commando Regiment
Paratroopers
Pathfinders Company
Special Operations Force

Portuguese Navy
Portuguese Marine Corps
Special Actions Detachment (DAE)
Sappers Divers Group

Portuguese Air Force
Portuguese Air Police
Core of Tactical Operations of Protection (NOTP - Núcleo de Operações Táticas de Proteção)

Romania

Ministry of Defense
Direcţia Generală de Informaţii a Apărării
Special Detachment of Protection and Intervention
Romanian Land Forces:
6th Special Operations Brigade "Mihai Viteazu"

Rwanda

Rwanda Defence Force
Special Forces Brigade

Russia

Special Operations Forces Command
 Special Purpose Center "Senezh"
 Special Purpose Center "Kubinka-2"
 344th Army Aviation Combat Center

Main Intelligence Directorate (GRU)
Unit 29155 - based at the 161st Special Purpose Specialist Training Center
Unit 54777 - alternately called the 72nd Special Service Center
Unit 26165 - Fancy Bear, STRONTIUM
Unit 74455 - also known as the Sandworm Team or the Main Center for Technologies
Special Forces of the GRU
Russian Ground Forces
 2nd Special Purpose Brigade in Promezhitsa, Pskov Oblast
 3rd Special Purpose Brigade in Tolyatti
 10th Special Purpose Brigade in Mol'kino, Krasnodar Territory
 14th Special Purpose Brigade in Ussuriysk
 16th Special Purpose Brigade in Tambov
 22nd Special Purpose Brigade in Stepnoi, Rostov Oblast
 24th Special Purpose Brigade in Irkutsk
Russian Airborne Troops
45th Guards Special Purpose Brigade
Russian Navy
Naval Special Reconnaissance (OMRP) – Reconnaissance divers under operational subordination to the Main Intelligence Directorate (GRU)
Counteraction Underwater Diversionary Forces and Facilities (PDSS) There are PDSS units in all major Naval Bases.
National Guard of Russia
 Dzerzhinsky Division (O.D.O.N.)
 604th Special Purpose Center
National Guard Naval Service Corps

Saudi Arabia

Royal Saudi Navy
 Special Navy Security Units (SNSU)

Saudi Arabian Army
64th Special Forces Brigade

Serbia

Serbian Armed Forces
72nd Brigade for Special Operations
63rd Parachute Brigade
MP Detachment for Special Operations "Cobras"

Singapore

Special Operations Task Force
Naval Diving Unit
Singapore Armed Forces Commando Formation
Special Operations Force

Slovakia

Slovak Armed Forces
5th Special Forces Regiment (Slovakia)

Slovenia

Posebna Enota za Specialno Taktiko (PEST) "FIST"

Somalia

Danab Brigade

South Africa

South African National Defence Force
Special Forces Brigade

Spain

 Mando Conjunto de Operaciones Especiales (MCOE, Joint Special Operations Command)
Spanish Land Army
Mando de Operaciones Especiales (MOE, Special Operations Command)
 Manages four Special Operations Groups (Grupo de Operaciones Especiales, GOE)
Spanish Navy
 Special Naval Warfare Command
Fuerza de Guerra Naval Especial (FGNE, Special Naval Warfare Force) - formerly Unidad de Operaciones Especiales (UOE, Special Operations Unit), until a 2009 merger with Unidad Especial de Buzos de Combate (UEBC, Special Combat Diver Unit) to form the FGNE.
Spanish Air and Space Force
Escuadrón de Zapadores Paracaidistas (EZAPAC, Paratrooper Sappers Squadron).

Sri Lanka

Army
 Special Forces Regiment
 Commando Regiment
Navy
 Special Boat Squadron
Air Force
 Regiment Special Force
 Special Airborne Force

Sweden

Swedish Armed Forces
Special Operations Task Group (SOG)
Swedish Army
Life Regiment Hussars (K 3)
31st Ranger Battalion
32nd Intelligence Battalion
323rd Parachute Ranger Squadron (Fallskärmsjägarna)
Norrland Dragoon Regiment (K 4)
193rd Ranger Battalion (Arméns jägarbataljon - AJB) 
Swedish Air Force
Blekinge Wing (F 17)
Air Force Rangers (Flygbasjägarna)
Swedish Navy
Amphibious Corps
1st Marine Regiment (Amf 1)
202nd Coastal Ranger Company (Kustjägarna)

Switzerland

Special Forces Command (KSK)
 Army Reconnaissance Detachment (ARD 10)
 Parachute Reconnaissance Company 17 (FSK-17)

Syria

Special Forces Command
14th Special Forces Division 
15th Special Forces Division
25th Special Forces Division

Taiwan - ROC

Republic of China Army
101st Amphibious Reconnaissance Battalion
Airborne Special Service Company
Republic of China Military Police
Republic of China Military Police Special Services Company

Republic of China Marine Corps
Amphibious Reconnaissance and Patrol Unit

Coast Guard Administration
Special Task Unit

Thailand

Royal Thai Army
Royal Thai Army Special Warfare Command (Royal Thai Army Special force)
 3rd Special Forces Regiment, King's Guard (Airborne)
 Special Operation Battalion, King's Guard 
 Ranger Battalion, King's Guard 
 Long Range Reconnaissance Patrols Company (LRRP)
Royal Thai Navy
Naval Special Warfare Command (Royal Thai Navy SEALs)
RTMC Reconnaissance Battalion

Royal Thai Air Force
Royal Thai Air Force Security Force Regiment
Special Operations Regiment (Air Force Commando)

Tunisia

Tunisian Army
 Special Forces Group (GFS)
 Military Intervention Group (GIM)
 
Tunisian Air Force

 Special Air Regiment (RCA)

Tunisian Navy
 	
 51st Regiment Marine Corps (RMC)
 52nd Regiment Marine Commandos (RMC)

Turkey

Turkish Armed Forces
 General Staff of the Turkish Armed Forces
Special Forces Command (OKK) (aka Maroon Berets)
 Turkish Naval Forces
Underwater Defence Group (SAS)
Underwater Offence Group (SAT)
 Turkish Air Force
Combat Search and Rescue (MAK)
Air Force Search and Rescue (AKIP)

Northern Cyprus 
 TRNC Special Task Force Command (ÖGKK)

Ukraine

Special Operations Forces - headquarters in Kyiv
 3rd Special Purpose Regiment (Kropyvnytskyi)
 8th Special Purpose Regiment (Khmelnytskyi)
 140th Special Purpose Center (Khmelnytskyi)
 Information Warfare & Psychological Operations

Ukrainian Navy units
 73rd Naval Special Purpose Center (73 MTSSN) (Ochakiv)
 801st Anti-Diversionary Detachment (801 OZB) (Ochakiv)

National Guard of Ukraine
1st Special Purpose Brigade (Kalinivka Airfield, Vinnytsia Oblast)

United Kingdom

United Kingdom Special Forces (UKSF)
 Royal Navy
 Special Boat Service (SBS)
 Special Boat Service (Reserve)
British Army
 Special Air Service (SAS)
 22 Special Air Service Regiment
 Special Air Service (Reserve) (SAS(R))
 21 Special Air Service Regiment (Artists) (Reserve) 
 23 Special Air Service Regiment (Reserve)
 Special Reconnaissance Regiment (SRR)
 18 Signal Regiment (Royal Corps of Signals)
 Special Forces Support Group
Royal Air Force/British Army
 Special Forces Flight of 47 Squadron (Royal Air Force)
 Joint Special Forces Aviation Wing
 7 Squadron (Royal Air Force)
 658 Squadron (Army Air Corps, British Army)

United States

United States Special Operations Command (USSOCOM)

 Joint Special Operations Command (JSOC)
 United States Army
 1st Special Forces Operational Detachment-Delta (1st SFOD-D or "Delta Force")
 Intelligence Support Activity (ISA)
 Regimental Reconnaissance Company (RRC) (part of the United States Army's 75th Ranger Regiment)
 Flight Concepts Division (FCD)
 United States Navy
 Naval Special Warfare Development Group (DEVGRU or "SEAL Team Six")
 United States Air Force
 24th Special Tactics Squadron (24th STS)
 66th Air Operations Squadron (66th AOS)
 427th Special Operations Squadron (427th SOS)
 Aviation Tactics Evaluation Group (AVTEG)
 Army Special Operations Command (USASOC)
 1st Special Forces Command (Airborne) - 1st SFC (A)
 Special Forces Groups ("Green Berets")
1st Special Forces Group
3rd Special Forces Group
5th Special Forces Group
7th Special Forces Group
10th Special Forces Group
19th Special Forces Group (National Guard)
20th Special Forces Group (National Guard)
 Psychological Operations Groups	
 4th Psychological Operations Group (Airborne)
 8th Psychological Operations Group (Airborne)
 95th Civil Affairs Brigade
 528th Sustainment Brigade
 112th Special Operations Signal Battalion (Airborne)
 389th Military Intelligence Battalion (Airborne)
 75th Ranger Regiment
 Army Special Operations Aviation Command (ARSOAC)
 160th Special Operations Aviation Regiment (Airborne) "Night Stalkers"
 Army Special Operations Command Flight Company
 Naval Special Warfare Command (NSWC)
 Naval Special Warfare Group 1
SEAL Teams 1, 3, 5 & 7
 Naval Special Warfare Group 2
SEAL Teams 2, 4, 8 & 10
Naval Special Warfare Group 4
Special Boat Teams 12, 20 & 22
Naval Special Warfare Group 8
SEAL Delivery Vehicle Teams 1 & 2
 Special Reconnaissance Teams 1 & 2
 Training Detachment 3
 Logistical Support 3
 Mission Support Center
 Naval Special Warfare Group 11
SEAL Teams 17 & 18 (Reserves)
 Air Force Special Operations Command (AFSOC)
1st Special Operations Wing
24th Special Operations Wing
27th Special Operations Wing
137th Special Operations Wing (ANG)
193rd Special Operations Wing (ANG)
919th Special Operations Wing (AFRC)
352nd Special Operations Group
353rd Special Operations Group
 Marine Corps Forces Special Operations Command (MARSOC)
 Marine Raider Regiment
 Marine Special Operations Support Group

Venezuela

Venezuelan Army
99th Army Special Operations Brigade

Venezuelan Air Force
 Special Operations Air Group 10
 Special Operations Air Group 15
 Special Operations Air Group 17

Vietnam

General Staff of the Vietnam People's Army
Vietnam People's Ground Force
 Special Forces Arms
Special Forces Command at Thanh Trì District, Hanoi 
1st Special Operations Brigade (M1 Brigade) at Hanoi
113rd Land Commando Brigade at Vĩnh Phúc Province
198th Land Commando Brigade at Đắk Lắk Province
429th Land Commando Brigade at Bình Dương Province
5th Maritime Commando Brigade at Ninh Thuận Province
High Command of Capital Hanoi
18th Commando Battalion at Hanoi
1st Corp
1 Commando Battalion under Corps' staff at Ninh Bình
2nd Corps
1 Commando Battalion under Corps' staff at Bắc Giang
3rd Corps
20th Commando Battalion under Corps' staff at Pleiku, Gia Lai
4th Corps
1 Commando Battalion under Corps' staff at Bình Dương
1st Military Region
20th Commando Battalion at Thái Nguyên
2nd Military Region
19th Commando Battalion at Phú Thọ
3nd Military Region
41st Commando Battalion at Hải Phòng
4th Military Region
31st Commando Battalion at Hà Tĩnh
5th Military Region
409th Commando Battalion at Đà Nẵng
7th Military Region
60th Commando Battalion at Bình Dương
9th Military Region
2012nd Commando Battalion at Vĩnh Long
Vietnam People's Navy
Naval Special Operations Force
126th Naval Special Operations Brigade at Hải Phòng city

Zimbabwe

Special Forces of Zimbabwe

See also

 List of commando units
 List of paratrooper forces
 List of police tactical units
 List of military diving units
 List of defunct special forces units
 List of reconnaissance units
 List of Special Reconnaissance organizations
 List of HALO/HAHO Jump capable units

Notes
Miscellaneous Notes

References

External links
 US Special Operation Forces – 2009 SOCOM Factbook
 China Special Operation Units
 ShadowSpear Special Operations: SOF Unit Profiles 

Special forces units and formations
 

Lists of military units and formations